During the 1999–2000 English football season, Wycombe Wanderers F.C. competed in the Football League Second Division where they finished in 12th position.

Final league table

Results
Wycombe's score comes first

Legend

Football League Division Two

FA Cup

League Cup

League Trophy

Squad
Appearances for competitive matches only

References

Wycombe Wanderers 1999–2000 at soccerbase.com (use drop down list to select relevant season)

See also
1999–2000 in English football

Wycombe Wanderers F.C. seasons
Wycombe Wanderers